The 1983 Kano State gubernatorial election occurred on August 13, 1983. PRP candidate Sabo Bakin Zuwo won the election, defeating NPP Abubakar Rimi.

Results
Sabo Bakin Zuwo representing PRP won the election, defeating former governor Abubakar Rimi representing NPP. The election held on August 13, 1983.

References 

Kano State gubernatorial elections
Kano State gubernatorial election
Kano State gubernatorial election